The Magic of Lassie is a 1978 American musical drama film directed by Don Chaffey, and starring Lassie, James Stewart (in his final appearance in a domestically-released live action feature film), Stephanie Zimbalist, Pernell Roberts and Michael Sharrett, with cameo appearances by Mickey Rooney and Alice Faye (in her final film role). Stewart appeared in one of only three musical film roles that he played: the first was Born to Dance (1936) in which he introduced the Cole Porter standard "Easy To Love" and the second was Pot O' Gold (1941). The screenplay and song score are supplied by the prolific Sherman Brothers, who worked as staff songwriters for Walt Disney and wrote songs for his films such as Mary Poppins (1964).  Their song "When You're Loved" was nominated for an Academy Award for "Best Original Song" and was sung by Debby Boone. It is also the only musical film featuring Lassie.

Released in the wake of Star Wars, the film was critically panned as old-fashioned, and flopped at the box office. Critics expressed dismay at Stewart singing unmemorable songs as the grandfather. Following the film's failure, he semiretired from acting.

Plot
The Mitchell Vineyard, in the rolling hills of Northern California, is the very blood of Clovis Mitchell (James Stewart), a spare and dignified grandfather and guardian to Kelly (Stephanie Zimbalist) and her brother Chris (Michael Sharrett). The heart of the household, though,  is Lassie, a handsome young collie, affectionate, obedient, sensitive, and very wise. A threat is in the air one night when Jamison (Pernell Roberts) and his associate Finch (Robert Lussier) appear at the winery and offer to buy the land from Clovis. They get a refusal from the old man, while Lassie growls in the background. Jamison promises to return, and does, to claim Lassie, one of a litter he says escaped during a fire. She has a tattoo mark in her right ear to prove it. Clovis has no alternative but to give up the dog, and tells his heart-broken grandchildren. Lassie has an alternative; taken by private plane to Jamison's home in Colorado Springs, fitted with a handsome green collar with gold studs, Lassie makes her escape. Chased by helicopter and kennel men through the rocks and hills of Colorado, Lassie manages to elude them and out-stare a cougar before she joins up with new friends – Gus (Mickey Rooney), a down-at-heel wrestling manager and Apollo (Mike Mazurki), a kindly mountain of a man and Gus's so-called star.

About the time they are binding up Lassie's sores, giving her food and water, and moving along in their van, young Chris bolts on his first day of the school term and sets off alone in search of Lassie. With his distraught grandfather setting out to find the boy, and Kelly and her sweetheart, attorney Allan Fogerty (Lane Davies), checking with the police, Chris takes a car conveyor in the direction of Colorado Springs. Soon after the truck takes off, a hungry and frightened Chris leaves the vehicle, buys food in a restaurant from a sympathetic waitress (Alice Faye), then goes out to look for another truck, and finally dives into the back of a cattle truck. The restaurant waitress, hearing reports of Chris's disappearance, calls his home and tells his sister where the boy has been, but Chris is on the move again, and so is Lassie. He in an empty cattle truck, she in the doorway of a freight car. Lassie leaps from the freight car and continues her journey. Clovis and the police officer who is aiding in the search for Chris, hear his cries as he is about to be crushed by a herd of Longhorns being loaded into his hiding place. Everybody is home – everybody but Lassie, whose ownership by Clovis has been clarified by Allan, the young attorney, who is about to join the family as an in-law.

Lassie continues her long, painful journey. Wet, sore-footed, and limping, she stumbles upon the Mike Curb Congregation, who are rehearsing. The group takes Lassie along to their engagement, where a flare is knocked over, causing a fire. Panic ensues. Lassie is trying to save the life of a kitten from a burning dressing room and is presumed dead, but she is not, and the next day – Thanksgiving – Lassie, tired and filthy, comes wagging over the hill to Chris, Clovis, Kelly, and home.

Cast
 James Stewart as Clovis Mitchell
 Stephanie Zimbalist as Kelly Mitchell
 Pernell Roberts as Jamison
 Michael Sharrett as Chris Mitchell
 Mickey Rooney as Gus
 Alice Faye as the Waitress (Alice)
 Gene Evans as Sheriff Andrews
 Mike Mazurki as Apollo
 Robert Lussier as Finch
 Lane Davies as Allan Fogerty
 James V. Reynolds as Officer Wilson
 Rayford Barnes as Reward Seeker
 Buck Young as TV Announcer
 Bob Cashell as Ed
 Gary Davis as Motorcycle Officer
 Carl Nielsen as Mr. Kern

Soundtrack (US version)

The film's soundtrack album was released in the United States by Peter Pan Records on November 23, 1978. It was the first soundtrack LP to be issued on the Peter Pan Records label under its Orange Blossom logo. The songs were composed by Robert B. Sherman and Richard M. Sherman, and all music was supervised, arranged, and conducted by Irwin Kostal.

Side 1
 "When You're Loved" – Debby Boone
 "Nobody's Property" – Mike Curb Congregation
 "Travellin' Music" – Mickey Rooney
 "There'll be Other Friday Nights" – Debby Boone
 "A Rose Is Not A Rose" – Pat Boone

Side 2
 "Banjo Song" – Mike Curb Congregation
 "Brass Rings and Day Dreams" – Debby Boone
 "That Hometown Feeling" – James Stewart
 "I Can't Say Goodbye" – Mike Curb Congregation
 "Thanksgiving Prayer" – James Stewart

Soundtrack (UK version)

A slightly different version of The Magic of Lassie soundtrack with a new cover was issued in the United Kingdom by Pickwick Records in February 1979. The running order of the tracks on this version differ from that of the original soundtrack and three soundtrack songs not featured on the US release are included on the UK release – an instrumental version of "Nobody's Property" conducted by Irwin Kostal, a new recording of "A Rose Is Not a Rose" by Alice Faye and a reprise of "When You're Loved" by Debby Boone.

Side 1
 "When You're Loved" – Debby Boone
 "Nobody's Property" – Mike Curb Congregation
 "Travellin' Music" – Mickey Rooney
 "There'll be Other Friday Nights" – Debby Boone
 "A Rose Is Not A Rose" – Pat Boone
 "Banjo Song" – Mike Curb Congregation

Side 2
 "Nobody's Property" (Instrumental) – Irwin Kostal
 "A Rose Is Not A Rose" – Alice Faye
 "That Hometown Feeling" – James Stewart
 "Brass Rings and Daydreams" – Debby Boone
 "Thanksgiving Prayer" – James Stewart
 "I Can't Say Goodbye" – Mike Curb Congregation
 "When You're Loved" (Reprise) – Debby Boone

Production and release

Filming

The film was shot from September 19 to late November 1977 on location in Sonoma County, California at Hop Kiln Winery, Griffin Vineyard on Westside Road, Healdsburg, California. Other locations included Boomtown in Reno, Nevada and Zion National Park in Utah.

Release

On July 27, 1978, the world premiere of The Magic of Lassie was held at Radio City Music Hall in New York City and broke a box-office record, grossing $40,673.75 on its opening day. It was released in New York on August 2 and nationwide on August 18. It opened in Los Angeles on December 8, 1978.

Novelization

A paperback novelization of the film was written by Robert Weverka and published by Bantam Books to coincide with the film's release.

References

External links
 
 
 
 

1978 films
1970s English-language films
1970s musical drama films
Films set in the 1970s
American musical drama films
Films directed by Don Chaffey
Lassie films
Musicals by the Sherman Brothers
Films about dogs
Films about orphans
Films set in California
Films set in Colorado
Films shot in California
Films shot in Utah
Films shot in Nevada
1978 soundtrack albums
1979 soundtrack albums
Pickwick Records soundtracks
Films scored by Irwin Kostal
Musical film soundtracks
Drama film soundtracks
1978 drama films
1970s American films